Provincial Civil Service, often abbreviated to as PCS, is the administrative civil service under Group A state service of the executive branch of the Government of Uttar Pradesh. It is also the feeder service for Indian Administrative Service in the state.

PCS officers hold various posts at sub-divisional, district, divisional and state level from conducting revenue administration and maintenance of law and order. The Department of Appointment and Personnel of the Government of Uttar Pradesh is the cadre-controlling authority of the service. Along with the Provincial Police Service (PPS) and the Provincial Forest Service (PFS), the PCS is one of the three feeder services to its respective All India Services.

Recruitment 

Half of the recruitment to the service is made on the basis of an annual competitive examination conducted by Uttar Pradesh Public Service Commission called as direct PCS officers as they are directly appointed at Deputy Collector rank. Half of the total strength of PCS officers is filled by promotion from Uttar Pradesh Lower Provincial Civil  Service (Tehsildar cadre) who are known as promotee PCS officers. PCS officers, regardless of their mode of entry, are appointed by the Governor of Uttar Pradesh.

Responsibilities of PCS officer 
The typical functions performed by a PCS officer are:
 To collect land revenue and function as courts in matters of revenue and crime (revenue courts and criminal courts of executive magistrate), to maintain law and order, to implement Union and State Government policies at the grass-root level when posted at field positions i.e. as sub-divisional magistrate, additional city magistrate, city magistrate, additional district magistrate and additional divisional commissioner. And to act as the agent of the government on the field, i.e. to act as the intermediate between public and the government.
 To handle the administration and daily proceedings of the government, including formulation and implementation of policy in consultation with the minister-in-charge, additional chief secretary/principal secretary and secretary of the concerned department.

Career progression 
After completing their training, a PCS officer generally serves as Sub Divisional Magistrates (SDMs). Further, they get promoted to city magistrate, and later,  Additional District Magistrate. Most districts have two to three posts of ADMs, most common of them being ADM (City), ADM (Finance/Revenue) and ADM (Executive). After a few years of service as they are also promoted to chief development officer (CDO). A CDO looks after rural development, and enjoys general superintendence over most sectoral development in a district. At the divisional level, PCS officers are posted as additional divisional commissioners. Most divisions have two to three such posts, most common of them being Additional Commissioner (Development), Additional Commissioner (Revenue) and Additional Commissioner (Executive). At the state secretariat, PCS officers serve as special secretaries, joint secretaries and deputy secretaries.

In municipal corporations administered by the Department of Urban Development, PCS officers serve as municipal commissioners and additional municipal commissioners. In development authorities administered by the Department of Housing and Urban Planning, PCS officers generally serve as secretaries and as vice chairmen. PCS officers also serve as deputy CEOs and additional CEOs in Noida, Greater Noida and Yamuna Expressway Authorities, which come under the Department of Infrastructure and Industrial Development. On a deputation, a PCS officer can be sent to one of the various directorates as additional directors, directors and chief general manager, additional/joint managing directors, managing directors in state PSUs.

After completion of two decades of service (generally till that period they reach up-to the level 14), those PCS officers who were directly recruited by Uttar Pradesh Public Service Commission (UPPSC) get promoted to the Indian Administrative Service, after confirmation by the Department of Personnel and Training of Government of India and the Union Public Service Commission. One-third of the total IAS strength in Uttar Pradesh is reserved for PCS officers (SCS quota).

Salary structure 
Generally most of the PCS officers (only those who were directly recruited by UPPSC) get promoted into the IAS after reaching up-to the level of Special Secretary Grade. Those who don't get promotion to IAS then get pay level 15, and get classified as 'superseded'.

Major concerns and reforms

Promotion to IAS
According to the Indian Administrative Service (Appointment by Promotion) Regulations, 1955, PCS officers are eligible for promotion to IAS after completion of eight years of service. But in reality, they are generally promoted to IAS after two decades in service.

Some PCS officers moved to the Allahabad High Court, due to the anomalies in their seniority which slowed down their promotion for almost one decade. The matter was resolved in 2012 as mentioned in their latest gradation list.

Political influence
Directly recruited IAS officers often complain about promotee IAS officers are given preference in field postings due to their close proximity to politicians which they form in two decades of their service. Since the state government were often ruled by regional parties, many politicians allegedly fix 'their men' as divisional commissioners and district magistrates.

Also, an inquiry of recruitment of PCS officers by the Uttar Pradesh Public Service Commission (UPPSC) from 2012, by the Central Bureau of Investigation (CBI), has been started.

Corruption
The house of a promotee IAS officer and a former district magistrate and collector of Ghaziabad, Vimal Kumar's house was raided by the Income Tax Department. Another promotee IAS officer, P. C. Gupta who was posted as CEO of Yamuna Expressway Industrial Development Authority was arrested for his alleged role in  land scam.

Notable PCS officers 
Members of the service include:
 Shrilal Shukla
 Shyam Singh Yadav
 Manoj Kumar Chauhan

See also 
 Provincial Finance and Accounts Service (Uttar Pradesh)
 Provincial Rural Development Service (Uttar Pradesh)
 Provincial Secretariat Service (Uttar Pradesh)
 Provincial Transport Service (Uttar Pradesh)

References

External links 

Civil Services of Uttar Pradesh
Government agencies established in 1858
1858 establishments in Asia
1858 establishments in India